Tamil Thalaivas is a Kabaddi team based in Tamil Nadu that plays in the Pro Kabaddi League. The team is owned by the consortium called Magnum Sports Private Limited, the parent company of Indian Super League club Kerala Blasters FC. Actor Vijay Sethupathi is the brand ambassador of the team. Tamil Thalaivas play their home matches at the Jawaharlal Nehru Stadium (Chennai), Tamil Nadu.

Since making its debut in the PKL, it hasn't had much success after finishing rock bottom in Zone B, both in 2017 and 2018-19. Thalaivas finished in 12th and 11th position in the subsequent 2019  & 2021-22 seasons. In their most successful season, TT finished 5th and qualified for the semi finals where they lost to Puneri Paltan in 2022.

Franchise history 

Pro Kabaddi League (PKL) is a professional kabaddi league in India, based on the format of the Indian Premier League T20 cricket tournament. The fifth edition of the tournament was played in 2017 with 12 franchises representing various cities in India. Representing Tamil Nadu, 'Tamil Thalaivas' made their debut in 2017. The team plays their home games at Jawaharlal Nehru Stadium (Chennai).

Current squad

Head coach record

Seasons

Season V

In the auction for the 2017 season, Thalaivas picked up defender Amit Hooda for Rs 63 lakh. They also roped in Indian national team captain Ajay Thakur.

Season VI

Season VII

Season VIII

It was an interesting auction for Tamil Thalaivas where they picked up players such as Manjeet, Surjeet and Prapanjan for big money and forming a balanced team. Despite early season form and some strong defensive displays by Sagar and Surjeet, it was an underwhelming season for Tamil Thalaivas yet again, finishing 11th in the league stage. Prapanjan missed out most of the season due to injury to the dismay of the local fans. Sagar, who was retained by the management was the find of the season for Tamil Thalaivas which was the only consolation.

Season IX

In a freak incident, Pawan Sehrawat injured himself in the first match of the Thalaivas season. Head coach J.Udayakumar was sacked mid-season after a bad run of form and ultra-defensive gameplay. Team India Head coach Ashan Kumar took charge of the team and was the reason behind team's upheaval of form. Thalaivas played attractive kabaddi with young players like Narendar coming to forefront breaking the 200 raid points barrier for the season. Ajinkya Pawar played the supporting role in the raiding department who was involved 2 mega 6 and 7 points raid against Telugu Titans in 2 separate matches. Sagar was the hero again in the defense supported well by Sahil, Mohit and M. Abhishek. Another injury blow to Sagar near the close season brought doubts on the play-off qualification but Thalaivas rallied behind the coach and kept winning which resulted in play-off qualification for the first time in their Pro Kabaddi history after winning the crunch match against UP Yoddhas in matchday 21. Tamil Thalaivas finished 5th in the league table and played against UP Yoddhas in Eliminator 2. Yoddhas were defeated in the shoot out after the match ended in a tie only for the second time in Pro Kabaddi KO round history. Tamil Thalaivas  qualified for the semi finals for the first time where they played  Puneri Paltan but lost the match by 2 points despite putting up a valiant effort. Despite missing their star players in Pawan and Sagar, this was the most successful season in the franchise's history.

Records

Overall results Pro Kabbaddi season

By opposition
''Note: Table lists in alphabetical order.

Sponsors

References 

Pro Kabaddi League teams
2014 establishments in Tamil Nadu
Kabaddi clubs established in 2014
 
Sport in Chennai
Kabaddi clubs established in 2017
2017 establishments in Tamil Nadu
Sports teams in Tamil Nadu